WZZT (102.7 FM) is a commercial radio station licensed to Morrison, Illinois, serving primarily Whiteside and Lee counties in the Rock River Valley.  Owned by Fletcher M. Ford, through licensee Virden Broadcasting Corp., the station airs a country music format.

History
WZZT launched on April 10, 1991; as of 1992, the station was owned by Whiteside Communications, Inc., and was transmitting at 3,000 watts.  In July 1993, it was announced that WZZT and its sister stations WSDR and WSSQ were to be sold to LH&S Communications, a company owned by Larry Sales and Howard Murphy which owned radio properties throughout the state of Illinois.  In 1998, WSSQ was acquired by Withers Broadcasting.  During the late 2000s and early 2010s, WZZT aired coverage of local high school football, including a 2011 playoff run by Newman Central Catholic.  As of 2011, WZZT was airing a rock music format which also included classic hits.

On July 5, 2017, WZZT changed their format from classic rock to country, branded as "Big Country 102.7". Effective July 28, 2017, Withers Broadcasting sold WZZT, WSDR, and WSSQ to Fletcher M. Ford's Virden Broadcasting Corp. for $400,000.

Current programming

Previous Logo

References

External links

1991 establishments in Illinois
Country radio stations in the United States
Radio stations established in 1991
ZZT
Whiteside County, Illinois